Hysteria, the fourth studio album by Katharine McPhee, was released via eOne on Friday, September 18, 2015. The album features collaborations with Ryan Tedder, Sia, Isabella Summers, and more.

Singles
The first single, "Lick My Lips," and its music video were released on May 26, 2015.

Track listing

Personnel
Credits adapted from Allmusic.com

Katharine McPhee – vocal,   primary artist
Christopher Braide –   mixing, producer
Smith Carlson –   producer
Jon Castelli – additional production,   mixing, producer
Chris Galland – assistant
Paul Grosso – creative director
Kuk Hurrell – vocal producer
Aaron Joseph –   producer
Andrew Kelly – art direction, design
Manny Marroquin – mixing
Tony Maserati – mixing
Ike Schultz – assistant
Dove Shore – photography
Slaptop – mixing, producer
Sam Sparro – additional production
Isabella Summers –   producer
Rob Wells –   producer

Charts

References

2015 albums
E1 Music albums
Katharine McPhee albums